

Regular season

Playoffs
Semi-Finals
St. Boniface defeated Monarchs 4-games-to-1
Brandon defeated Barons 4-games-to-1
Turnbull Cup Championship
St. Boniface defeated Brandon 4-games-to-none with 1 game tied
Western Memorial Cup Semi-Final
St. Boniface lost to Fort William Canadiens  (TBJHL) 4-games-to-3 with 1 game tied

Awards

All-Star Teams

References 
Manitoba Junior Hockey League
Manitoba Hockey Hall of Fame
Hockey Hall of Fame
Winnipeg Free Press Archives
Brandon Sun Archives

MJHL
Manitoba Junior Hockey League seasons